Towson Academy is a historic National Guard armory building located at Towson, Baltimore County, Maryland. It is a two-story brick structure constructed in 1933 with full basement, faced with a smooth light-colored, marble-like stone veneer.  It features a T-shaped plan with a two-story front "head house" section and a one-story perpendicular "drill hall" extending to the rear and its façade is detailed to recall Medieval fortifications, with towers flanking the central entrance.

It was listed on the National Register of Historic Places in 1985.

References

External links
, including photo from 1980, at Maryland Historical Trust

Buildings and structures in Baltimore County, Maryland
Armories on the National Register of Historic Places in Maryland
Government buildings completed in 1933
National Register of Historic Places in Baltimore County, Maryland